Melipotis calamioides is a species of moth in the family Erebidae. It is found on Curaçao.

References

Moths described in 1887
Melipotis
Moths of the Caribbean